The Crimean-Circassian Wars of 1479–1490 refers to a series of military conflicts between the Crimean Khanate and the Kabardian Principality.

History 
In 1479, a campaign of the Crimean Tatars took place on the lands of the Circassians. They captured the fortresses of Kopa and Anapa, where Turkish garrisons were left. Many Circassians were captured and sold into slavery.

At the very beginning of the 1490s, the Crimean Khan Mengli Gerai undertook a campaign against the Circassians. This was the first campaign of the Crimean khans in a series of numerous campaigns against the tribes of the Circassians, Circassians and Kabardians in order to conquer and subdue them.

References 

15th-century conflicts
15th century in the Crimean Khanate
Wars involving the Circassians
Military operations involving the Crimean Khanate